Hadapsar is a developed town in eastern Pune City, Maharashtra. After 1990, Hadapsar developed into a major industrial area and is now one of the most densely populated and developed areas of Pune District. It is well connected to all parts of city. Distances to popular city centers is: Pune Railway Station 8 km, Lohegaon Airport 8 km, Koregaon Park 5 km, Swargate Bus Stand 7 km and Shivaji Nagar Railway Station 12 km.

History 
During the second Anglo-Maratha war, a battle was fought between Jaswantrao (Yashwantrao) Holkar and Peshwa (and Scindia) in which Jaswantrao defeated the army of Peshwa and Scindia at Hadapsar in 25 October 1802.

Industry
Hadapsar is an industrial suburb and part of the Pune Municipal Corporation. Hadapsar is home to corporations such as Serum Institute of India PVT LTD, MMR department, Honeywell, Bharat Forge, Gits Food Products, Indian Hume Pipe Factory, EDP, and Accurate. It is also home to the Hadapsar Industrial Estate.

Hadapsar has 3 special economic zones (SEZ): Magarpatta, Amanora Park Town, and SP Infocity. In Magarpatta, technology companies occupy 10 towers each housing multiple multinational companies.

Major sites

Tourist attractions in the vicinity include Theur, Kanifnath Temple, Purandar Fort and Mastani Talav (a lake). The annual vari of Sant Dnyaneshwar and Sant Tukaram palkhee from Alandi and Dehu respectively, pass through Hadapsar, after which the routes are again separated. 
 Kanifnath Temple: This ancient temple is believed to be of the Navnaths. A small cave forms its entrance. Women are not allowed to pass through the cave. Kanifnath temple is around 30 km from Pune. From Hadapsar, two roads reach the temple. One is via Wadki, and the other is via Wadki and Saswad.
 Theur: Theur is a pilgrimage site for Chintamani Ganapati Temple. This Ganesha Temple is one of the eight Ashtavinayak temples. This temple stands fifth in the line of Ashtavinayaks. It is believed that Lord Brahma found peace of mind at this place by seeking the help of Lord Ganesha.
 Mastani Talav: People believed that Bajirao and Mastani rode horses and spent time in the octagonal lake near Pune's outskirts. It can be seen from Dive ghat on the way from Saswad to Pune. This pond is situated in village Wadaki.
 Purandar Fort: Purandar fort is the birthplace of Sambhaji Raje Bhosle (the second Chhatrapati and son of Chhatrapati Shivajiraje Bhosle). Purandar stands 4,472 ft above sea level in the Western ghat (southeast side of Pune) near Saswad village, about 40 km from Hadapsar. Purandar fort is a well known trekking site.
 Tukai Tekadi: A hill located near the Gliding Centre. A temple is nearby for goddess Tukai.
 Amanora Town Centre/Amanora Mall: Shopping mall in Amanora Park Town. It is a gated community spread over 400 acres. Amanora Park Town contains Pune's tallest buildings ,society called Sun Sapphire Shinde Vasti.
 Seasons Mall: Shopping mall located on the outskirts of Magarpatta, which hosts the largest multiplex in India with 15 screens.
 Dorabjees Royal Heritage Mall: Shopping mall located near Undri. It includes a 4 screen multiplex.
 Mayureshwar Wildlife Sanctuary: Wildlife sanctuary located about 60 km from Hadapsar, home to the Indian gazelle (Chinkara) in addition to other flora and fauna.
 Bhooj Adda Bengali Restaurant in Hadapsar 
The Gliding Centre at Hadapsar Airport offers three Super Blanik L23 aircraft, which are two-seater gliders (sailplanes). Pilots must possess a valid Glider Pilot License. The center offers training to aspiring pilots. Gliding season takes place between monsoon seasons, from October until May or early June.

Educational institutions
Schools and colleges in Hadapsar include:
 Kalyani School
 Sadhana College
 RIMS International School-Undri
 P.D.E.A.'s College of Engineering
 Manjari (Bk.) EuroSchool - Undri
 Delhi Public School
 The Bishops School-Undri
 Sasane Education Society's New English School
 Annasaheb Magar College
 College of Engineering Hadapsar
 Sumatibhai Shah Ayurvedic college
 ISMR
 Jayawantrao Sawant College of Engineering
 Jayawantrao Sawant College of Pharmacy
 Sane Guruji Vidyalaya
 IBS (ICFAI Business School)
 Pawar Public School, Hadapsar
The Arhanas Rosary School
 Vishwas institute of Paramedical Science, hadapsar
 Colorland School - Uruli Devachi
 ST LEO Nursery School - Kale Padal

Neighborhoods
 Camp Pune
 Hadapsar Gaon (village)
 Gadital (Bus Depot)
 Tukari Tekadi
 Bekarainagar (Bus Depot)
 Satavwadi
 Malwadi
 Gondhale Nagar
 Manjri Budruk (BK)
 Nandini SpringField
 Manjri Greens
 Satyapuram
 Satav Nagar
 Mundhwa
 Keshav Nagar
 Green City
 Aakashwani
 Sadesatra Nali
 Sadhunana Vasti
 Orient Garden
 Sasane Nagar
 Chintamani Nagar
 Sayyad Nagar
 Magarpatta
 Amanora Park Town
 Handewadi
 Kalepadal/Kale Borate Nagar
 Bhosale Garden
 Laxmi Colony
 Mahadev Nagar
 Gopalpatti
 Ghule Vasti
 Autadewadi
 Mohammadwadi
 Phursungi
 Tukaidarshan
 Uruli Devachi
 Wadki
 Hole Vasti
 Holkarwadi
 Shewalwadi
 Undri

Transport
Hadapsar railway station is little ahead of Amanora town centre and local trains travelling Southbound towards Daund Junction/Solapur stop here. Pune Junction railway station provides more rail services. Currently Hadapsar railway station is ready to use for traveller and very good facility made available for the tourist traveling south Maharashtra and India. It will act as a satellite station to Pune. 

New Pune Airport Chhatrapati Sambhaji Raje International Airport is a proposed greenfield airport project to serve the city of Pune, India. It will be built near Saswad and Jejuri in Purandar Talukas of Pune District in the Indian state of Maharashtra. The proposed airport will be spread over 2,400 hectares.[2][3] This airport will also boost trade from Pune and neighbouring districts as it will have its own dedicated cargo terminal.

Lohegaon Air Force Station serves as the main passenger airport for the city. Due to its status as a "restricted international airport", only two to four international flights can operate from there. Moreover, it is an Air Force base and has a single civil terminal which operates both international as well as domestic traffic.[7]

Almost 65 to 70 flights operate connecting major domestic destinations. This is crowding the existing airport and leading to delay of flights as the airport has only eight parking bays out of which one is used for VIP's and other is used for charter operations and the remaining carry the load of international as well as domestic flights. Hence, this led to the need for a dedicated international airport for the city as the city is one of the fastest-growing cities in India and is included in the Smart City program of the Indian government. However, until completion of the new international airport, the existing airport will be expanded with a second terminal.[8]

Hadapsar is located along the Mumbai Hyderabad National Highway, also known as NH65, which also connects Pune and Solapur. It is also well connected to Pune Nagar highway through Kharadi bypass.

Hadapsar Gadital is very well known central bus station and is connected to every location of the city by PMPML MSRTC buses. The PMPML also operates AC buses on the many routes including Katraj-Hadapsar BRT Route, Hinjewadi, Nigdi and Wagholi. State Transport buses have a stopover on solapur and saswad national highways.

Gallery

References

Neighbourhoods in Pune